Rasmus Strindö (born November 24, 1994) is a Swedish ice hockey defenceman. He played with HV71 of the Swedish Hockey League (SHL) 13/14.

He made his Swedish Hockey League debut playing with HV71 during the 2013–14 SHL season.

References

External links

1994 births
Living people
HV71 players
Swedish ice hockey defencemen
Ice hockey people from Gothenburg